Palaeomeryx is an extinct genus of Artiodactyla, of the family Palaeomerycidae, endemic to Europe and Asia from the Miocene epoch, 16.9 – 7.25 Ma, existing for approximately .

Taxonomy

Palaeomeryx was named by von Meyer (1834). It is the type genus of Palaeomerycidae, Palaeomerycinae. It was assigned to Palaeomerycidae by Carroll (1988) and Sach and Heizmann (2001); and to Palaeomerycinae by Prothero and Liter (2007).

Fossil distribution
Amor, Leiria, Portugal
Level C1, Quarry Quebra Bilhas, Lisbon, Portugal
Buñol, Valencia, Spain
Lufeng, Yunnan Province, China
Krivoy Rog, Ukraine

References 

Palaeomerycidae
Miocene even-toed ungulates
Tortonian extinctions
Miocene mammals of Europe
Prehistoric even-toed ungulate genera
Burdigalian first appearances